Napoleon Sarony (1821–1896) was a popular American photographer and lithographer.

Sarony may also refer to: 

Leslie Sarony (1897–1985), British entertainer, singer and songwriter
Otto Sarony (1850–1903), American photographer, son of Napoleon Sarony
Burrow-Giles Lithographic Co. v. Sarony, an 1894 U.S. Supreme Court decision